Desert Law is a 1918 American silent Western film directed by Jack Conway and starring Gayne Whitman, Jack Richardson and George C. Pearce.

Plot summary 
Don McLane and Julia Wharton are engaged. Rufe Dorsey, the local boss, who is above the law, covets Julia and "frames" Don for murder. He is given a prison sentence. Don is liberated at a junction point by Julia's brothers, and they beat a retreat to the Wharton homestead, whither Dorsey goes to get the prisoner again. A stranger who recently appeared in the town joins the defending forces, and when the fight goes against them, he reveals himself to Dorsey as the Governor of the state. Dorsey has gone too far and determines to kill the Governor too, but the Governor has sent for the militia and they arrive in time to rescue the besieged, while a friend of Don's rides in with the "murdered" man, who was "very much alive this morning, but plenty dead now," for he had been shot in self defense.

Cast
 Gayne Whitman as Donald McLane 
 Jack Richardson as Rufe Dorsey 
 George C. Pearce as The Stranger 
 Leota Lorraine as Julia Wharton 
 Ray Hanford as Sheriff 
 Bert Appling as Deputy 
 Jim Farley as Deputy 
 Phil Gastrock as Logan 
 Joseph Singleton as Jim 
 Leo Pierson as Dick 
 Curley Baldwin as Buck

References

Bibliography
 James Robert Parish & Michael R. Pitts. Film directors: a guide to their American films. Scarecrow Press, 1974.

External links
 

1918 films
1918 Western (genre) films
1910s English-language films
Films directed by Jack Conway
American black-and-white films
Triangle Film Corporation films
Silent American Western (genre) films
1910s American films